The bill entitled To specify the size of the precious-metal blanks that will be used in the production of the National Baseball Hall of Fame commemorative coins became a law on May 17, 2013 during the 113th United States Congress.  It was first introduced in the United States House of Representatives on March 12, 2013 by Rep. Richard L. Hanna (R-NY).  The bill corrects a technical problem in a previous law dealing with commemorative coins.

Background
According to a summary by the House Republicans, the bill was merely to correct a technical error made in the National Baseball Hall of Fame Commemorative Coin Act.

Provisions/Elements of the bill
This summary is based largely on the summary provided by the Congressional Research Service, a public domain source.

The new law amends the National Baseball Hall of Fame Commemorative Coin Act to modify the requirements for the production of gold and silver coins commemorating the National Baseball Hall of Fame to require such coins to be struck on planchets of specified diameters.

Procedural history

House
The bill was first introduced in the United States House of Representatives on March 12, 2013, by Rep. Richard L. Hanna (R-NY). It was referred to the United States House Committee on Financial Services. On April 24, 2013, it passed by a simple voice vote.

Senate
The bill was received in the United States Senate on April 25, 2013. On May 7, 2013, the bill passed the Senate by Unanimous consent.

President
The bill was presented to President of the United States Barack Obama on May 9, 2013. It was signed into law by him on May 17, 2013.

See also
List of bills in the 113th United States Congress
National Baseball Hall of Fame and Museum
Planchet

References

External links

Library of Congress - Thomas H.R. 1071 
beta.congress.gov H.R. 1071
GovTrack.us H.R. 1071
OpenCongress.org H.R. 1071
WashingtonWatch.com H.R. 1071
House Republican page on H.R. 1071

United States federal financial legislation
Acts of the 113th United States Congress
National Baseball Hall of Fame and Museum